Stablein is a surname. Notable people with the surname include:

Brian Stablein (born 1970), American football player
Bruno Stäblein (1895–1978), German musicologist
George Stablein (born 1957), American baseball player
Marilyn Stablein (born 1946), American poet, writer and artist